Bernard Bartholomew "Frenchy" Uhalt (April 27, 1910 – September 3, 2004) was a Major League Baseball outfielder.

Uhalt was much better known, however, for his long career in the Pacific Coast League, where he played all or part of 20 seasons, between 1928 and 1948. In the PCL, he played for the Oakland Oaks (1928–36 and 1948), Hollywood Stars (1938–42) and San Francisco Seals (1943–47). He also spent a season and a half with the American Association Milwaukee Brewers. In 1949, he served as player-manager for the Fresno Cardinals.

Overall, Uhalt had over 3,000 hits in the minors, with a batting average of .300. He is a member of the Pacific Coast League Hall of Fame.

External links

Major League Baseball outfielders
Chicago White Sox players
Oakland Oaks (baseball) players
Bakersfield Bees players
Milwaukee Brewers (minor league) players
Hollywood Stars players
San Francisco Seals (baseball) players
Fresno Cardinals players
Minor league baseball managers
Baseball players from Bakersfield, California
1910 births
2004 deaths